Juan Donoso Cortés, marqués de Valdegamas (6 May 1809 – 3 May 1853) was a Spanish counter-revolutionary author, diplomat, politician, and Catholic political theologian.

Biography

Early life 
Cortés was born at Valle de la Serena (Extremadura) on 6 May 1809. His father, D. Pedro Donoso Cortés was a lawyer and landowner, and a descendant of the conquistador Hernán Cortés. His mother, Maria Elena Fernandez née Canedo Cortés was a provincial heiress. During his youth, Juan Donoso was tutored by the liberal Antonio Beltran in Latin, French, and other subjects required for entrance to a university. At 11, possibly due to issues at home, Juan Donoso left to study at the University of Salamanca. He only remained there a year before leaving to study at the Colegio de San Pedro de Caceres. In 1823, at age 14, he entered the University of Seville to study law, and would remain there until 1828. It was here that Donoso Cortés first encountered philosophy; he fell under the influence of liberal and traditionalist thinkers such as John Locke and Louis de Bonald.

Donoso returned home to work at his father's law practice for a couple of years. At this time he continued his eclectic reading habits. In October 1829, Cortés was offered at professorship in aesthetics and politics at the Colegio de San Pedro de Caceres. He was carried away by Romanticism and stressed feeling over rationality. He criticized medieval feudalism but defended the Papacy and the Crusades, which he believed engendered vitality into European civilization. Carried away by the rationalism prevalent in Spain following upon the French invasions, he ardently embraced the principles of Liberalism and fell under the influence of Jean-Jacques Rousseau, whom he later characterized as "the most eloquent of sophists".

Entry into politics and journalism 
Cortés married Teresa née Carrasco in 1830, however their marriage lasted only five years with the death of Teresa after the birth of their only child, Maria. It was also at this time that Juan Donoso entered politics along with his brother-in-law. He entered politics as an ardent liberal under the influence of Manuel José Quintana. After the death of King Ferdinand VII, Donoso, along with most of Spain's liberals, backed the late king's fourth wife, Maria Christina, and her claim to the throne of Spain. They were opposed by Ferdinand's clerical and conservative brother Carlos, and his conservative supporters who were known as Carlists. In 1832, Donoso wrote a memorandum to King Ferdinand defending female succession as being in line with the king's Pragmatic Sanction of 1830. For his efforts, the new queen regent would appoint Donoso to a position in the Secretariat of State.

The death of King Ferdinand in 1833 precipitated the First Carlist War. Donoso protested the massacre of friars by anti-clerical liberals in Madrid in July 1834 in a memo to Maria Christina.

Donoso's views began to shift after the 1836 rising at La Granja, where soldiers in the royal palace forced Maria Cristina to reinstitute the liberal Constitution of 1812. At this time Donoso was appointed as a cabinet secretary and elected to the Cortes as a member of the liberal Moderate Party, which represented bourgeois interests and supported a constitutional monarchy. At this time he gave a series of lectures for the party, A Defense of Representative Government, where he lauded representative government and rationalism, but at the same time defended dictatorship as sometimes being a necessary evil.

The period between 1837 and 1840 saw the nadir of Donoso's journalistic career; writing for various publications such as El Correo Nacional, El Porvenir, and El Piloto. His drift into conservatism continued during this time; Donoso attacked Victor Hugo's depiction of Mary Stuart, he argued in favor of the use of rich articles in religious rites. His most extensive article during this time, "Classicism and Romanticism", written in El Correo Nacional in August or September 1838, urged a synthesis between classicist and romantic art forms. Donoso's articles brought him a great deal of notoriety and condemnation, with 65 members of the Cortes accusing Donoso of being subversive.

Donoso recognized the power of the press and sought to influence public discussion through his publications, yet he was also one of the sharpest critics of the press and the freedom of the press. He believed that journalism was an almost sacred vocation but that this vocation was often abused and was used to spread mindless chatter and gossip. He was critical of the use of the press to spread revolutionary, socialistic, and anti-Christian ideas. Donoso went as far as to believe that freedom of the press itself was the result of the abandonment of Christian moral principles: editors were a new priesthood devoted to furthering the revolution and the authority of Christian doctrine was replaced with endless discussion. He was also critical of the use of the press by governments to achieve centralization and bureaucratization.

Shift to conservatism 

By the end of the First Carlist War in 1839, Donoso had become disillusioned with liberalism, rationalism, and the bourgeoise. He became something of a recluse and rarely left the royal palace. With the fall of the regency of Maria Christina, Donoso went into exile with the former Queen-regent; from March 1841 to the autumn of 1843, Donoso spent almost all of his time in Paris. During this time he began a history of the regency of Maria Christina, however it would never be finished. During this time Donoso came more strongly under the influence of the French traditionalists Joseph de Maistre and Louis de Bonald.

Donoso returned to Spain in late 1843 and played a key role in granting majority status to Queen Isabella II, ending the regency of Baldomero Espartero. For his services to the crown Donoso was made private secretary to the young Queen and he was raised to the peerage. Shortly after, in May 1844, General Narváez came to power as prime minister. Donoso's liberalism saw a brief upsurge with the early reforms of Pope Pius IX, who appointed Pellegrino Rossi to be prime minister of the Papal States.

The Revolutions of 1848, along with the assassination of Rossi and the death Donoso's pious Carlist brother Pedro brought an end to any trace of liberalism in Donoso's thinking. In January 1849, Donoso gave a speech in the Cortes, "On Dictatorship," defending the actions of General Narvaez in suppressing any traces of revolutionary activity in Spain. Donoso spoke out vociferously against the chaos he saw unfolding across Europe in the Cortes; he attacked socialism as the result of the erosion of Christian morality and atheism. Donoso would later become a sharp critic of Narvaez and his speeches denouncing him in the Cortes would lead to Narvaez's resignation. During this time Donoso briefly served as ambassador to Berlin.

Later life 
In 1851, Donoso was appointed as the Spanish ambassador to France, presenting his credentials to the court of President, and later Emperor, Louis Napoleon, who would reign under the title of Napoleon III. Donoso was initially a confidant of Napoleon, and may have helped finance his coup. However, as time went on it became clear that Donoso and Napoleon did not share a common intellectual purpose. Still, Donoso worked to obtain international recognition for the new regime and he represented Queen Isabella II at the Emperor's marriage to the Spanish countess Eugénie de Montijo.

Donoso's life took on a newfound piety during this time: he went on pilgrimage, wore a hair shirt, volunteered with the Society of St. Vincent de Paul, visited slums and prisons, and donated much of his wealth to the poor. He also spent much of time writing in opposition to the Liberal French Catholics and their leader Bishop Dupanloup. 

It was during this time Donoso Cortés issued his Ensayo Sobre el Catolicismo, el Liberalismo, y el Socialismo Considerados en sus Principios Fundamentales (1851), or Essays on Catholicism, Liberalism, and Socialism, Considered in their Fundamental Principles, the work for which he is most well-known. It was written at the insistence of Louis Veuillot, who was an intimate friend of Juan Donoso. The work placed Cortés in the first rank of Catholic apologists and made him a defender of Ultramontanism. It is an exposition of the impotence of all human systems of philosophy to solve the problem of human destiny and of the absolute dependence of humanity upon the Catholic Church for its social and political salvation. He excoriates liberalism as the bridge that ultimately leads to atheistic socialism.

During his last years he also engaged in a series of correspondences that developed his thought further; firstly with the former Queen regent Maria Christina; with Cardinal Fornari, the papal nuncio to France; and Atanazy Raczyński, a Polish nobleman and Prussian ambassador to Spain, who was a close friend of Donoso. He also briefly engaged in a correspondence with Pope Pius IX, and warned the pope about the continuing threat from Gallicanism and democracy. Many of Donoso's ideas would be incorporated into Pius's encyclical Quanta Cura and its attached Syllabus of Errors.

Juan Donoso Cortés died in the Spanish Embassy in Paris on 3 May 1853. His funeral was held in the 
Church of Saint Phillipe du Roule
in Paris where he would be interred. His remains were transferred to Madrid on 11 May 1900, along with the remains of Goya, Moratin, and Melendez Valdes. His remains are currently interred in the pantheon of the royal cemetery of San Isidro el Real.

Donoso Cortés's works were collected in five volumes at Madrid (1854–1855) under the editorship of Gavino Tejado.

Influence 
In his work Political Theology (1922), political philosopher Carl Schmitt devotes large portions of his final chapter ("On the Counterrevolutionary Philosophy of the State") to Donoso Cortés, praising him for recognizing the importance of decision and of the concept of sovereignty. Schmitt also credited Donoso's Discourse on Dictatorship with initiating the demise of the progressive notion of history.

Quotations 
"True progress consists in submitting the human element which corrupts liberty, to the divine element which purifies it. Society has followed a different path in looking upon the empire of faith as dead; and in proclaiming the empire of reason and the will of man, it has made evil, which was only relative, contingent and exceptional, absolute, universal, and necessary. This period of rapid retrogression commenced in Europe with the restoration of pagan literature, which has brought about successively the restoration of pagan philosophy, religious paganism, and political paganism. At the present time the world is on the eve of the last of these restorations, – that of pagan socialism." (Letter to Montalembert, June 4, 1849.)

"It follows from this that the Church alone has the right to affirm and deny, and that there is no right outside her to affirm what she denies, or to deny what she affirms. The day when society, forgetting her doctrinal decisions, has asked the press and the tribune, news writers and assemblies, what is truth and what is error, on that day error and truth are confounded in all intellects, society enters on the regions of shadows, and falls under the empire of fictions…"

"The doctrinal intolerance of the Church has saved the world from chaos. Her doctrinal intolerance has placed beyond question political, domestic, social, and religious, truths—primitive and holy truths, which are not subject to discussion, because they are the foundation of all discussions; truths which cannot be called into doubt for a moment without the understanding on that moment oscillating, lost between truth and error, and the clear mirror of human reason becoming soiled and obscured…"

Bibliography
 Obras de Don Juan Donoso Cortés, Marqués de Valdegamas, Ordenadas y Precedidas de una Noticia Biográfica por Gavino Tejado, Impr. de Tejado, 1854-1855:
 Vol I.
 Vol. II.
 Vol. III.
 Vol. IV.
 Vol. V.
 Obras Completas de Donoso Cortés, Juan, Marqués de Valdegamas, 1809-1853, 2 Vols., Editorial Católica, 1946.
 Obras Completas. Edición, Introducción y Notas de Carlos Valverde, 2 Vols., Editorial Católica, 1970.

English translations of Donoso Cortés
 Essay on Catholicism, Liberalism and Socialism, Considered in their Fundamental Principles, tr. Madeleine Vinton Goddard. Philadelphia: J.B. Lippincott & Co., 1862.
 Essays on Catholicism, Liberalism and Socialism, Considered in their Fundamental Principles, tr. William McDonald. Dublin: M.H. Gill & Son, 1879.
 Essays on Catholicism, Liberalism and Socialism: Considered in Their Fundamental Principles, Cornell University Library, 2010.
 In Menczer, Béla, 1962. Catholic Political Thought, 1789-1848. University of Notre Dame Press.
 "The Church, the State, and Revolution," pp. 160–176.
 "Socialism," pp. 177–182.
 On Order: Two Addresses Newly Translated into English by Juan Donoso Cortes. Plutarch Press, 1989.
 Selected Works of Juan Donoso Cortes: Contributions in Political Science. Praeger, 2000.
 Donoso Cortes: Readings in Political Theory, R.A. Herrera ed., Sapientia Press of Ave Maria University, 2007.
 Letter to Cardinal Fornari on the Errors of Our Time, [n.d.]

References

Sources

References

Further reading

 Armas, Gabriel de (1953). Donoso Cortés: su Sentido Trascendente de la Vida. Madrid: Colección Cálamo.
 Balakrishnan, Gopal (2000) "The Enemy: An Intellectual Portrait of Carl Schmitt." London: Verso
 Brophy, Liam (1950). "Donoso Cortes: Statesman and Apologist," The Irish Monthly, Vol. 78, No. 927, pp. 416–421.
 Dempf, Alois (1937). Christliche Staatsphilosophie in Spanien. Salzburg: Pustet.
 Fagoaga, Miguel (1958). El Pensamiento Social de Donoso Cortés. Madrid: Editora Nacional.
 Galindo Herrero, Santiago (1957). Donoso Cortés y su Teoría Política. Diputación Provincial de Badajoz, Badajoz.
 Graham, John Thomas (1974). Donoso Cortés; Utopian Romanticist and Political Realist. University of Missouri Press.
 Gutiérrez Lasanta, Francisco (1949). Pensadores Políticos del Siglo XIX. Madrid: Editora Nacional.
 Herrera, Robert A. (1988). "The Great in the Small: Donoso Cortes' Variations on a Theme from the Civitas Dei," Augustiniana, No. 1-4, pp. 140–147.
 Herrera, Robert A. (1995). Donoso Cortés: Cassandra of the Age. Grand Rapids, Mich.: William B. Eerdmans Pub. Co.
 Kennedy, John J. (1952). "Donoso Cortés as Servant of the State," The Review of Politics, Vol. 14, No. 4, pp. 520–550.
 McNamara, Vincent J. (1992). "The Hegelianism of Young Donoso Cortés." In: Saints, Sovereigns, and Scholars. New York and Geneva: Peter Lamb, pp. 337–348.
 McNamara, Vincent J. (1992). "Juan Donoso Cortés: un Doctrinario Liberal," Rev. Filosofía Univ. Costa Rica, Vol. 30, No. 72, pp. 209–216.
 Monsegú, Bernardo (1958). Clave Teológica de la Historia según Donoso Cortés. Badajoz: Impr. de la Excma. Diputación Provincial.
 Neill, Thomas P. (1955). "Juan Donoso Cortés: History and 'Prophecy'," The Catholic Historical Review, Vol. 40, No. 4, pp. 385–410.
 Regalado García, Antonio (1967). "The Counterrevolutionary Image of The World," Yale French Studies, No. 39, pp. 98–118.
 Sánchez Abelenda, Raúl (1969). La Teoría del Poder en el Pensamiento Político de Juan Donoso Cortés. Editorial Universitaria de Buenos Aires.
 Schmitt, Carl (2002). "A Pan-European Interpretation of Donoso Cortes," Telos, No. 125, pp. 100–115.
 Schramm, Edmund (1936). Donoso Cortés: Su Vida y su Pensamiento. Madrid: Espasa Calpe.
 Schramm, Edmund (1952). Donoso Cortés: Ejemplo del Pensamiento de la Tradición. Madrid: Ateneo.
 Spektorowski, Alberto. "Maistre, Donoso Cortés, and the Legacy of Catholic Authoritarianism," Journal of the History of Ideas, Vol. 63, No. 2, pp. 283–302.
 Suárez Verdeguer, Federico (1964). Introducción a Donoso Cortés. Madrid: Rialp.
 Suárez Verdeguer, Federico (1997). Vida y obra de Juan Donoso Cortés. Pamplona: Ediciones Eunate.
 Tarragó, Rafael E. (1999). "Two Catholic Conservatives: The Ideas of Joseph de Maistre and Juan Donoso Cortes," Catholic Social Science Review, Vol. 4, pp. 167–177.
 Tejada, Francisco Elías de (1949). Para una Interpretación Extremeña de Donoso Cortés. Diputación Provincial de Cáceres.
 Viereck, Peter (1956). Conservatism from John Adams to Churchill. Princeton: D. Van Nostrand Company, Inc.
 Westemeyer, Dietmar (1940). Donoso Cortés: Staatsmann und Theologe. Münster: Regensberg.
 Wilhelmsen, Frederick (1967). "Donoso Cortes and the Meaning of Political Power," The Intercollegiate Review, Vol. 3, No. 3, pp. 109–127.
 Wilson, Francis G. (1960). "Donoso Cortes: The Continuing Crisis," Journal of Inter-American Studies, Vol. 2, No. 1, pp. 45–63.

External links

Internet Encyclopedia of Philosophy Entry on Cortés

1809 births
1853 deaths
Counter-revolutionaries
People from the Province of Badajoz
Spanish Roman Catholics
Spanish philosophers
Spanish politicians
Spanish male writers
Spanish monarchists
Roman Catholic writers
Members of the Royal Spanish Academy
Writers from Extremadura
Ambassadors of Spain to France
19th-century Spanish writers
19th-century Spanish philosophers
University of Salamanca alumni
19th-century male writers
Spanish political writers